Joe Keogh (January 13, 1932 – May 15, 1996) was an American judge and politician. He served as a Democratic member of the Louisiana House of Representatives.

Life and career 
Keogh was born in McComb, Mississippi. He attended Louisiana State University.

In 1964, Keogh was elected to the Louisiana House of Representatives, serving until 1968. He was a judge for Louisiana's 19th Judicial Court.

Keogh died in May 1996 at the Baton Rouge General Hospital in Baton Rouge, Louisiana, at the age of 64.

References 

1932 births
1996 deaths
People from McComb, Mississippi
Democratic Party members of the Louisiana House of Representatives
20th-century American politicians
Louisiana state court judges
20th-century American judges
Louisiana State University alumni